Manuel Quero Turillo (1554 – 2 September 1605) was a Roman Catholic prelate who served as Bishop of Cefalù (1596–1605).

Biography
Manuel Quero Turillo was born in Jaen, Spain in 1554.
On 18 December 1596, he was appointed during the papacy of Pope Clement VIII as Bishop of Cefalù. 
On 30 May 1597, he was consecrated bishop by Giulio Antonio Santorio, Cardinal-Priest of Santa Maria in Trastevere. 
He served as Bishop of Cefalù until his death on 2 September 1605.

References

External links and additional sources
 (for Chronology of Bishops) 
 (for Chronology of Bishops) 

16th-century Italian Roman Catholic bishops
17th-century Italian Roman Catholic bishops
Bishops appointed by Pope Clement VIII
1554 births
1605 deaths